This is a list of subsidiaries, equities, and cash equivalents owned by multinational holding company Berkshire Hathaway.

Cash and equivalents
As of June 30, 2022, Berkshire Hathaway had $26.534 billion in cash and cash equivalents, and $74.803 billion in short-term investments in U.S. treasury bills.

Operating subsidiaries
Companies for which Berkshire Hathaway owns wholly or controls a majority of voting shares.

U.S.-listed public company and ETF holdings
Sourced from Berkshire Hathaway's Form 13F-HR filed with the Securities and Exchange Commission:

Non-US public companies 
At year end 2021, Berkshire Hathaway Energy owns 7.7% of Chinese electric vehicle manufacturer BYD Company, and Berkshire Hathaway owns approximately 6% stakes in three major Japanese conglomerates, ITOCHU Corporation, Mitsubishi Corporation and Mitsui & Co., Ltd.

Former subsidiaries

References

External links
 Subsidiaries of Berkshire Hathaway
 Berkshire Hathaway SEC Filings
 CNBC Berkshire Hathaway minority holdings

Berkshire Hathaway

Berkshire Hathaway